Danielle Andrea Harris (born June 1, 1977) is an American actress and film director. She is known as a "scream queen" for her roles in multiple horror films, including four entries in the Halloween franchise (Halloween 4 and 5; 1988–89) as Jamie Lloyd, and the Halloween remake and its sequel as Annie Brackett (2007–09). Other such roles include Tosh in Urban Legend (1998), Belle in Stake Land (2010), and Marybeth Dunston in the Hatchet series (2010–17). In 2012, she was inducted into the Fangoria Hall of Fame.

Harris began her career as a child actress, with various appearances on television and prominent roles in films such as Marked for Death (1990), Don't Tell Mom the Babysitter's Dead (1991), The Last Boy Scout (1991), Free Willy (1993) and Daylight (1996). She is also known for her voice work, which includes playing Debbie Thornberry for the full run of the Nickelodeon series The Wild Thornberrys (1998–2004) and in the related films The Wild Thornberrys Movie (2002) and Rugrats Go Wild (2003).

In 2013, Harris made her feature directorial debut with the horror film Among Friends, after previously directing Madison (a segment in the unfinished anthology film Prank) in 2008 and a Stake Land companion short film in 2010.

Early life 

Harris was born in Plainview, New York and was raised by her mother Fran, along with her sister Ashley. Harris is Jewish. While living in Florida during elementary school, Harris won a beauty contest, winning a trip to New York City for ten days. While there, she was offered various modeling jobs, but turned them down because they were all far from her home. Her mother was eventually transferred back to New York for work and Harris began work as a model. She also began appearing in television commercials.

Career

1985–1989: Early roles and Halloween 

In 1985, at age seven, Harris was cast in the role of Samantha "Sammi" Garretson in the ABC soap opera One Life to Live and stayed on the program for three years. Her character was considered a "miracle child", extracted as an embryo from the womb of her deceased mother and implanted in a family friend, whom her father later married. In 1987, Harris made a guest appearance in the series Spenser: For Hire.

Following her early television work, Harris successfully auditioned for the role of Jamie Lloyd in the fourth edition of the Halloween franchise, beating out several other young actresses, Melissa Joan Hart among them.  Halloween 4: The Return of Michael Myers was released in October 1988 to commercial success, going on to gross over $17 million worldwide on a $5 million budget. On doing this type of film at such a young age, Harris stated:

Harris returned the following year for the sequel, Halloween 5: The Revenge of Michael Myers, which was not as successful as its predecessor. Harris portrayed Jamie Lloyd once again, but her character was mute for the first half of Halloween 5 owing to events in the previous film.

1990s: Film, television and voice work 

In 1990, Harris appeared in Marked for Death as protagonist John Hatcher (Steven Seagal)'s niece Tracey. The action film had a $12 million budget and earned $43 million domestically and $57 million worldwide. 1991 saw Harris partake in several film and television projects, including the made-for-television films Don't Touch My Daughter, as a young girl who is kidnapped and molested, and The Killing Mind, where she portrayed main character Isobel as a child. Later that year, Harris made an appearance in the sketch-oriented show In Living Color.

Harris' next film role was in the 1991 comedy Don't Tell Mom the Babysitter's Dead, as Melissa Crandell, with the story revolving around five siblings whose mother goes to Australia for two months, only to have her children's babysitter die. The young protagonists choose not to tell their mother and attempt to live on their own. The same year, Harris had a guest role in the series Eerie, Indiana, portraying a character who receives a heart transplant then begins to act like the heart's original owner, and also guest starred in an episode of Growing Pains, as Susie Maxwell. Harris had the role of Darian Hallenbeck in the 1991 action film The Last Boy Scout, alongside Bruce Willis and Damon Wayans. The film grossed $7,923,669 in its opening weekend, and the total gross was $59,509,925. Reviews were mixed, and some critics cited the Christmastime release for such a violent film as a reason for its underwhelming box office.

1992 saw Harris participate in the pilot for the potential CBS series 1775, although it was not picked up. Between 1992 and 1993, Harris had the recurring role of Molly Tilden on the sitcom Roseanne (which she would reprise in a 2021 episode of Roseanne sequel series The Conners), then joined Roseanne Barr again in 1993 for the television film The Woman Who Loved Elvis, this time as daughter Priscilla. She appeared in an episode of Jack's Place the same year, portraying a teenage runaway. Also in 1993, Harris portrayed Gwenie in the film Free Willy, which had a US gross of $7,868,829 in its opening weekend, and went on to make $77,698,625 in the US and $153,698,625 worldwide. In 1994, she appeared on the drama series The Commish, playing the role of Sheri Fisher for one episode. The same year, Harris portrayed the main character's daughter Jessica in the television film Roseanne: An Unauthorized Biography, based upon her former co-star Roseanne Barr. She then guest starred in the sitcom Boy Meets World, as Theresa "T.K." Keiner.

In 1995, Harris learned that the producers of Halloween: The Curse of Michael Myers were looking for an actress over the age of 18 to play the role of Jamie Lloyd. Only 17 at the time, Harris got emancipated in order to participate, but was dissatisfied with the fate of the character in the script and the low salary offered. She abstained from reprising her role and was replaced by J. C. Brandy, although she can still be seen in The Producer's Cut of the film, which replays Halloween 5s ending. Harris has since admitted to being glad she did not rejoin the series at this point, believing that this allowed her to make her later return in the 2007 remake of the original Halloween.

In 1996, Harris shared dual roles with Katherine Heigl for the television film Wish Upon a Star: Harris played Hayley Wheaton, a nerdy girl who switches bodies with her older, more popular sister Alexia (Heigl). Also in 1996, Harris starred in the films Shattered Image and Back to Back, and, the same year, had the role of young survivor Ashley Crighton in Daylight, the disaster film toplined by Sylvester Stallone. While Daylight has a 26% approval rating on Rotten Tomatoes and grossed $33 million in the United States, it took in over $126 million overseas, resulting in gross earnings of $159,212,469 worldwide. In 1997, Harris appeared in two episodes of the medical drama ER as Laura Quentin. In 1998, Harris had the lead role of Lulu in the film Dizzyland, where she portrayed a sexually abused teenager, and also appeared in an episode of Diagnosis: Murder. She then appeared in the popular slasher Urban Legend, her first horror film since her early Halloween credits. She portrayed Tosh, a goth girl who is murdered while her roommate Natalie (Alicia Witt) is resting on the other side of the room.

Beginning in 1998, Harris was among the main cast of Nickelodeon's animated children's series The Wild Thornberrys, chosen to voice Debbie Thornberry, the sister of a girl who can talk to animals. The protagonist, Eliza, travels the world with her family and uses her special ability to help the animals. The series lasted for five seasons, with a total of 92 episodes. It spawned several animated films early in the next decade, with its series finale airing in 2004. Harris would continue to make film and television appearances while doing The Wild Thornberrys: she portrayed a teenage witch named Aviva in a 1998 episode of Charmed, starred in the 1999 film Goosed as protagonist Charlene in her younger years, and appeared as Justine in the television film Hard Time: Hostage Hotel.

2000s: Continued work and return to Halloween 

 Harris had a supporting role in the crime and comedy film Poor White Trash in 2000 and went on to star in the 2001 comedy Killer Bud. Between 2000 and 2002, Harris was a cast member of the series That's Life. Her character, Plum Wilkinson, featured in all but eight episodes and was involved in a romantic relationship with Kevin Dillon. Her animated series The Wild Thornberrys had spin-off movies in the early 2000s: the television film The Origin of Donnie from 2001 was followed by the 2002 theatrical release of The Wild Thornberrys Movie, which grossed $40,108,697 in the US, and a further film, Rugrats Go Wild, dealt with the Thornberrys meeting the characters from the popular series Rugrats. Released in 2003, it opened at #4 at the box office and grossed $39 million in the US, about the same as the Thornberrys Movie. Harris also appeared in an episode of The West Wing, had a supporting role as Leila in the 2003 television film The Partners and was in the theatrically released films Debating Robert Lee and Em & Me (both 2004). From 2004 to 2005, she was a main cast member of the computer-animated sitcom Father of the Pride, appearing in all 14 episodes.

In January 2007, it was announced that Harris was cast as Annie Brackett in the remake of horror landmark Halloween. This marked Harris' first participation in the Halloween franchise since The Revenge of Michael Myers eighteen years prior. The remake, also called Halloween and directed by Rob Zombie, had Scout Taylor-Compton and Malcolm McDowell in main roles. Harris has revealed that Zombie wanted no one from previous Halloweens in the film, but, once she auditioned, he changed his mind. The film, which cost $15 million to make, opened at #1 at the box office and went on to gross $80,253,908 worldwide, becoming the highest-grossing Halloween in unadjusted U.S. dollars, which it remained for more than a decade. Unlike in the original version, Annie Brackett survives, after Michael Myers (Tyler Mane) tries his hand at torture instead of killing her quickly. Annie encounters her attacker very much exposed, having stripped to the waist, which marked Harris' first onscreen nudity. Harris admits that she refused the offers to cover her body while the cameras were not rolling, to better portray a vulnerable Annie against the monster. On facing Michael Myers once again and at the same time doing her first nude scene, she also commented:

Harris then began to appear in more horror productions and fantastic films. That same year, she starred in the also Halloween-themed Left for Dead. For Fearnet, she hosted Route 666: America's Scariest Home Haunts. 2009 saw her in a leading role in Blood Night: The Legend of Mary Hatchet, as Felicia Freeze in the comedic superhero adventure film Super Capers and alongside Robert Patrick in The Black Waters of Echo's Pond. Fear Clinic, a Fearnet original web series featuring Harris as well as veterans Robert Englund and Kane Hodder, made its debut the week of Halloween 2009. Also in 2009, Harris reprised her role of Annie Brackett in the sequel Halloween II. Halloween II was officially released on August 28, 2009, in North America, and was met with negative reception from most critics. On October 30, 2009, it was re-released in North America to coincide with the Halloween holiday weekend. The original opening of the film grossed less than that of the 2007 remake, with approximately $7 million. The film would go on to earn $33,392,973 in North America and $5,925,616 in foreign countries, giving Halloween II a worldwide total of $39,318,589.

2010–present: Numerous horror films and directorial debut 

Harris continued to develop her "scream queen" identity with growing genre credits. She starred alongside Lance Henriksen, Bill Moseley, AFI's Davey Havok and Nicki Clyne in the illustrated film series Godkiller. Beginning with 2010's Hatchet II, Harris has taken over the leading role of Marybeth in the Hatchet series, after Tamara Feldman declined to reprise her character. Further genre credits include Jim Mickle's second feature film, the vampire/post-apocalyptic epic Stake Land, Cyrus: Mind of a Serial Killer, ChromeSkull, Havenhurst and Michael Biehn's The Victim, with lead roles in Shiver, See No Evil 2, Inoperable, Camp Cold Brook and others. She equally provided the voice and basis for an animated Barbara in Night of the Living Dead: Darkest Dawn, director Zebediah de Soto's prequel/re-telling of George A. Romero's 1968 original. Work in other types of films includes dramas like The Trouble with the Truth and Quentin Tarantino's Once Upon a Time in Hollywood. Harris made her directorial debut with the horror comedy Among Friends, in which she also has an appearance. The film, which was picked up for distribution by Lionsgate, was released on August 27, 2013.

Since the 2010s, Harris has had guest appearances in the television shows Psych (as a murder suspect), Bones (as a murder victim), as herself in Holliston and Naked Vegas, and also returned to voice Debbie Thornberry for a saucy Robot Chicken parody of The Wild Thornberrys, among others.

On April 3, 2022, Harris appeared as a guest for the 2022 Dead Meat Horror Awards along with other legends such as Tony Todd, Bonnie Aarons, Ray Chase and Heather Langenkamp.

Public image 

Harris has been referred to as "horror's reigning scream queen", by the New York Daily News and various other outlets, and was called "the Natalie Portman of Horror" by director Sylvia Soska. She has provided the cover feature for such publications as Girls and Corpses, Gorezone magazine, Invasion magazine and Scream Sirens as well as a subject for the photo-book The Bloody Best Project, a collection of artistic pictures showcasing the celebrities of the horror film industry. Harris was also featured in Five Finger Death Punch's first music video, "The Bleeding", in 2007. In 2011, Harris won the Best Actress Award at the Shockfest Film Festival for her starring role in the short Nice Guys Finish Last. The 2012 Burbank International Film Festival gave Harris its Best Actress Award for her portrayal of literary heroine Wendy Alden in Shiver.

Personal life 

In 2013, Harris became engaged to David Gross. The couple married in a private ceremony in Holualoa, Hawaii, on January 4, 2014, and had a son in 2017. Their second son was born in late 2018.

Stalking incident 

Harris was stalked in 1995 by an obsessed fan, Christopher Small, who wrote letters threatening to kill her. Small was later arrested after bringing a teddy bear and a shotgun to her home. On January 29, 2007, Harris appeared on an episode of the Dr. Phil show, sharing her experience with other equally affected people. The stalker was obsessed with her character of Molly Tilden from the television series Roseanne. In October 2009, Harris was granted a restraining order against Small, who began sending her messages on Twitter.

Filmography

Film

Television

Video games

Music videos

References

External links 

 
 
 
 

1977 births
20th-century American actresses
21st-century American actresses
Actresses from Florida
Actresses from New York (state)
American beauty pageant winners
American child actresses
American child models
American film actresses
American Internet celebrities
American soap opera actresses
American television actresses
American voice actresses
American women film directors
Jewish American actresses
Living people
People from Plainview, New York
People from Port Orange, Florida
Film directors from Florida
21st-century American Jews